The Philippines women's national ice hockey team is the national women's ice hockey team of the Philippines.

History
The women's national team of the Philippines made their international debut at the 2017 IIHF Women's Challenge Cup of Asia in Bangkok, Thailand. The team was mentored by Filipino head coach John Steven Füglister at the tournament. 

In 2018, the Philippines competed at the Division I tournament of the 2018 IIHF Women's Challenge Cup of Asia in Kuala Lumpur, Malaysia. They finished third place in the tournament ahead of India and behind first placers and host Malaysia, and the United Arab Emirates. The squad's head coach for this tournament was Hector Navasero. They improved their finishing in the 2019 edition hosted in Abu Dhabi, United Arab Emirates, clinching the Division I title after winning 2–1 over the host United Arab Emirates in the final. The team was coached by Carl Montano.

They will participate at the 2019 Philippine Ice Hockey Tournament and the 2019 Land of Smiles Tournament in Thailand.

International competitions

Challenge Cup of Asia

Team
For the 2017 IIHF Women's Challenge Cup of Asia

Head coach: Steven Füglister

Head coach
 Steven Füglister (2017)
 Hector Navasero (2018)
 Carl Montano (2019–)

All-time record against other nations
Last match update: 10 March 2022

References

Ice hockey in the Philippines
Ice hockey
Women's national ice hockey teams in Asia